The FN P-12 shotgun is a pump-action 12-gauge shotgun designed and manufactured by FN Herstal assembled in Portugal. The weapon, which was introduced during the summer of 2012, is intended to complement the FN SLP.

The P-12 has a Weaver accessory rail and comes standard with a flip-up rear sight and a fiber-optic front sight which provide a  sight radius. It also features a trigger pull of 6.2 to 7.3 lbs.

Design
The P-12 has a receiver constructed from aircraft-grade aluminum and the matte-black synthetic stock features a non-slip recoil pad fit with steel sling swivel studs.

References

External links 
 
 FNH Firearms Blog

FN Herstal firearms
Pump-action shotguns
Shotguns of Belgium